It's a Small World is an attraction at Fantasyland in several Disney theme parks.

It's a Small World may also refer to:
It's a Small World (1935 film), a film starring Spencer Tracy and Wendy Barrie
It's a Small World (1950 film), a film written and directed by William Castle
"It's a Small World (After All)", a 1964 song composed by the Sherman Brothers as the musical component of the It's a Small World attraction
It's a Small World (TV series), short-lived DuMont Television Network series (June to July 1953)
"It's a Small World" (Leave It to Beaver)
"It's a Small World After All" (Lois & Clark), an episode of Lois & Clark: The New Adventures of Superman

See also
 Small world (disambiguation)